Microlophus yanezi, commonly called Yanez's lava lizard, is a species of lizard in the family Tropiduridae. The species is endemic to the Chilean Matorral within the nation of Chile.

Etymology
The specific name, yanezi, is in honor of Chilean zoologist José Lautaro Yáñez-Valenzuela (born 1951).

Habitat

Reproduction
M. yanezi is oviparous.

References

Further reading
Ortiz-Zapata JC (1980). "Revisión taxonómica del Género Tropidurus en Chile ". Actas de la Reunión Iberoamericana de Zoologia 1: 355–377. (Tropidurus yanezi, new species). (in Spanish).

yanezi
Endemic fauna of Chile
Lizards of South America
Reptiles of Chile
Chilean Matorral
Reptiles described in 1980